Dixie Tavern is a bar in Portland, Oregon.

Description
Dixie Tavern is a two-level bar at the intersection of 3rd Avenue and Couch Street the northwest Portland part of the Old Town Chinatown neighborhood. Portland Monthly has described the business as a "rock & roll tavern" with live music, multiple bars, and regular 80s nights. In 2017, Grant Butler of The Oregonian wrote, "This Southern-fried rock and roll bar ... is known for female bartenders who dance on the countertops to Bon Jovi and Lynyrd Skynyrd – very "Coyote Ugly," circa 2000. Dixie Tavern may not be trendy, but it's one of Old Town's most-popular bars." Lizzy Acker included the bar in the newspaper's 2017 list of "23 places to go dancing in Portland" and said Dixie Tavern offers dancing to country and rock music.

History

Dixie Tavern was established in 2005, opening the space which previously housed Cobalt Lounge. In 2020, Portland Monthly Margaret Seiler said the bar was "one of the few 21st-century new businesses outside of the South to use Dixie in its name". The Portland Mercury Alex Zielinski has described Dixie Tavern as a "country bar" with security staff and without a strict dress code.

The business is owned by Dan Lenzen. In 2020, during the COVID-19 pandemic, Lenzen worked with the Old Town Community Association to advocate for a "night mayor" to "liaison between hospitality businesses and city government". He said the bar suffered economic loss and the neighborhood saw more crime during the pandemic. He also joined the Rose City Downtown Collective, described by KATU as "a group of downtown Portland businesses and organizations is asking for help in rebuilding 'the spirit' of the city's core, which has been hit hard by months of coronavirus restrictions and protests". In 2021, Lenzen advocated for extended hours, and he and Dixie Tavern employees blocked off nearby streets, a service which had previously been provided by the city for security purposes. He was appreciative of the city's efforts to clean up streets ahead of the MLS Cup. He hoped the work would continue and said, "Here's a plea to all the people in charge of being able to get activation: we need this, what we’ve done today. We all need this. A vibrant downtown is important to the entire region."

Reception

In 2014, Drew Tyson included Dixie Tavern in Thrillist's 2014 list of "Portland's 10 (Best?) Bad Decision Bars". The website's Pete Cottell included the bar in a 2015 list of "10 Portland Bars You Should Avoid Once You're 30".

Brooke Jackson-Glidden included Dixie Tavern in Eater Portland 2020 overview of "Where to Throw a Bachelorette Party in Portland". She wrote, "Country fans know Dixie is the place to be for dancing, but the bar dips its toes into other styles of music so everyone can have a good time. Plus, Dixie can host big parties, for those looking for their own space among the ruckus."

References

External links

 
 Dixie Tavern at Zomato

2005 establishments in Oregon
Drinking establishments in Oregon
Northwest Portland, Oregon
Old Town Chinatown
Restaurants established in 2005